John Diva & the Rockets of Love is a German glam metal band founded in 2009. Sometimes abbreviated to JDATROL, the group is known for its live shows and the elaborate legend surrounding its members. The five-piece has made it its self-described mission to evoke "the halcyon days of Van Halen, Bon Jovi, Kiss, and Whitesnake, blessed with a smidge of Def Leppard and Mötley Crüe."

Background 
According to the band's official biography, founding member and lead singer John Diva was brought up in San Diego, California by a single mother heavily involved in the city’s Rock scene. His father, a showband musician who toured the US casino circuit, was absent for most of his life. Through his mother, he first came in contact with music: “It was cherry pop tarts, Cheetos and a whole lotta AC/DC in my world.“ After witnessing what he perceived to be the decline of the golden era of rock’n’roll, Diva first decided to become a musician.

During his high school years in San Diego, Diva met guitarist J.J. Love. Having just immigrated to the US from Mexico, Love introduced Diva to the Scorpions, prompting the latter to retain a German accent to spite his father after an argument. While in school, the two toyed with the idea of forming a band, ultimately not following through. However, Diva first started writing songs during this period.

After finishing school, Diva worked odd jobs, finally finding employment as a songwriter for bands such as Mötley Crüe, Guns’N’Roses, Bon Jovi, and Aerosmith in 1986. Enjoying his new-found wealth and surrounded by drugs and groupies, he cultivated a hard-partying lifestyle and started collecting cars. Similar themes permeate his music to this day.

The early nineties’ shift in popular culture towards Grunge and overall darker motifs saw a decrease in demand for Diva’s music. Financial troubles and alcohol abuse made him overthink his approach to music, with him eventually deciding on forming a band with longtime companion Love.

Looking for more musicians to join them, Diva asked Snake Rocket to play guitar alongside Love, with former NASCAR driver Lee Stingray handling the drums and Frenchman Remmie Martin taking over on bass guitar. First playing under the moniker Rockets Of Love in 2009, the five-piece saw little to no opportunities in the US and began focussing on the European market.

Since 2013 
In Europe, the band first popped up in 2013, bringing a full catalog of classic rock songs to stages across the continent. The band has since established a strong live presence and built a sizeable fanbase, for example by playing Wacken Open Air a total of three times

Mama Said Rock Is Dead 
The band released their debut album Mama Said Rock Is Dead on February 8, 2019, preceded by its lead single "Lolita", which was made available on November 23, 2018. The tracks were produced in Malaga by Michael Voss (Mad Max, Michael Schenker, Tony Carey) and in Münster with the help of Chris von Rohr (Krokus, Gotthard). “The process was so smooth and so “right” in stark contrast to previous studio ventures,” says Diva of the recording, “and I put that down to the producing talents of Voss, his obvious Scorpions education and the quality of the material he had to work with.”

Themes of the album vary between lost romantic opportunities ("Just The Night Away") and homages to inspirations like David Lee Roth ("Lolita"). "Rock’n’ Roll Heaven" deals with late icons and is dedicated to Diva’s mother.

To support the release, the band toured Europe throughout the end of 2018 and most of 2019, playing nearly 60 shows.

Tracklist

Critical reception and performance 
The album received favorable reviews in the USA, with Music Guru Radio rating it 5 out of 5 stars. Chris McCormick of Madness To Creation remarked how hard it was “to believe this is a new addition to rock and not an album from the 1980s.“

Sean Bennett from Australian website The Rockpit lauded how the band sounds “tight throughout, with fantastic guitar work & vocals, all the while being backed by solid bass & drum work.“

British outlets also overall recommended the release to their audiences, with Midlands Metalheads giving it a 5 out of 5 rating. Ghost Cult Mag called the album „fun“, but noted a lack of distinction from its inspirations.

In Germany, Mama Said Rock Is Dead entered the official album charts at 24. The German edition of international music magazine Metal Hammer evoked comparisons to Steel Panther and referred to the band as a “live phenomenon“.

Confronted about the sexual nature of his lyrics in light of the Me Too era, Diva acknowledged the importance of the movement but added that "sex positivity doesn’t exclude respect. As a rockstar, you have a certain amount of power that you have to wield responsibly.“

American Amadeus 
The band recently announced a new album, American Amadeus, with its release date set to 4 September 2020. A tour of Germany is planned for November and December 2020.

Discography

Albums 

 Live At Wacken (July 2017)
 Mama Said Rock Is Dead (8 February 2019)
 American Amadeus (15 January 2021)
 The Big Easy (17 March 2023)

Singles & Videos 

 "Lolita" (23 November 2018)
 "Rock’n’Roll Heaven" (18 January 2019)
 "Blinded" (15 March 2019)
 "Rocket Of Love" (24 May 2019)
 "Wild Wild Life" (23 September 2019)
 "Bling Bling Marilyn" (11 September 2020)
 "Drip Drip Baby" (23 October 2020)
 "American Amadeus" (04 December 2020)
 "Voodoo Sex & Vampires" (01 October 2021)
 "God Made Radio" (15 September 2022)
 "The Big Easy" (09 December 2022)

Tours 

 Viva La Diva-Tour (November 2017 - April 2018)
 Europe In Ecstasy-Tour (support for Kissin Dynamite, March 2019 - April 2019)
 Mama Said Rock Is Dead-Tour (October 2019 - December 2019)
 American Amadeus release shows (September 2020 - cancelled)
 American Amadeus-Tour (November 2020 - December 2020 - cancelled)
 American Amadeus-Tour (October + November 2021 + January and May 2021)

References 

2009 establishments in California
German glam metal musical groups
German heavy metal musical groups
Glam metal musical groups from California
Heavy metal musical groups from California